State Route 220 (SR 220) is a  state highway that runs southwest-to-northeast in a semicircle completely within Lincoln county in the east-central part of the U.S. state of Georgia.

Route description
SR 220 begins at an intersection with US 378/SR 47 (Double Branches Road) southwest of Lincolnton. It heads southeast to an intersection with SR 43 (Thomson Highway), which is located south of Lincolnton. The highway travels northeast until it reaches a second intersection with SR 47 (Augusta Highway, located southeast of Lincolnton). It leads to J. Strom Thurmond Reservoir. SR 220 continue to the northeast and turns to the north-northeast, crosses Strom Thurmond Lake, and then meets its northeastern terminus, an intersection with US 378/SR 43 (Coach Jimmy Smith Highway).

SR 220 is not part of the National Highway System, a system of roadways important to the nation's economy, defense, and mobility.

Major intersections

See also

References

External links

 Georgia Roads (Routes 201 - 220)

220
Transportation in Lincoln County, Georgia